Mount Riga State Park is an undeveloped public recreation area located in the town of Salisbury, Connecticut. The state park offers opportunities for hiking and bow hunting. The Undermountain Trail connects to the northernmost section of the Appalachian Trail in Connecticut from the trail head at Mount Riga State Park's parking lot on Connecticut Route 41. The park is managed by the Connecticut Department of Energy and Environmental Protection.

References

External links
Mount Riga State Park Connecticut Department of Energy and Environmental Protection

State parks of Connecticut
Parks in Litchfield County, Connecticut
Salisbury, Connecticut
Protected areas established in 1954